Steven Benjamin Goodman (July 25, 1948 – September 20, 1984) was an American folk  and country singer-songwriter from Chicago. He wrote the song "City of New Orleans", which was recorded by Arlo Guthrie and many others including John Denver, The Highwaymen, and Judy Collins; in 1985, it received a Grammy award for best country song, as performed by Willie Nelson. Goodman had a small but dedicated group of fans for his albums and concerts during his lifetime. His most frequently sung song is, "Go Cubs Go" about the Chicago Cubs. Goodman died of leukemia in September 1984.

Personal life
Born on Chicago's North Side to a middle-class Jewish family, Goodman began writing and performing songs as a teenager, after his family had moved to the near north suburbs. He graduated from Maine East High School in Park Ridge, Illinois, in 1965, where he was a classmate of Hillary Clinton. Before that, however, he began his public singing career by leading the junior choir at Temple Beth Israel in Albany Park.  In the fall of 1965, he entered the University of Illinois and pledged the Sigma Alpha Mu fraternity, where he on lead guitar, Ron Banyon on rhythm guitar, Steve Hartmann on bass, and Elliot Englehardt on drums formed a popular rock cover band, "The Juicy Fruits". He left college after one year to pursue his musical career. In the early spring of 1967, Goodman went to New York, staying for a month in a Greenwich Village brownstone across the street from the Cafe Wha?, where Goodman performed regularly during his brief stay there.

Returning to Chicago, he intended to restart his education. In 1968 Goodman began performing at the Earl of Old Town and The Dangling Conversation coffeehouse in Chicago and attracted a following. By 1969, Goodman was a regular performer in Chicago, while attending Lake Forest College. During this time Goodman supported himself by singing advertising jingles. He dropped out of school again to pursue his musical dream full-time after discovering, in 1969, the cause of his continuous fatigue was actually leukemia, the disease that was present during the entirety of his recording career, until his death in 1984.

In September 1969 he met Nancy Pruter (sister of R&B writer Robert Pruter), who was attending college while supporting herself as a waitress. They were married in February 1970. Though he experienced periods of remission, Goodman never felt that he was living on anything other than borrowed time, and some critics, listeners and friends have said that his music reflects this sentiment.  His wife Nancy, writing in the liner notes to the posthumous collection No Big Surprise, characterized him this way:

Basically, Steve was exactly who he appeared to be: an ambitious, well-adjusted man from a loving, middle-class Jewish home in the Chicago suburbs, whose life and talent were directed by the physical pain and time constraints of a fatal disease which he kept at bay, at times, seemingly by willpower alone . . . Steve wanted to live as normal a life as possible, only he had to live it as fast as he could . . . He extracted meaning from the mundane.

Musical career
Goodman's songs first appeared on Gathering at The Earl of Old Town, an album produced by Chicago record company Dunwich in 1971.  As a close friend of Earl Pionke, the owner of the folk music bar, Goodman performed at The Earl dozens of times, including customary New Year's Eve concerts.  He also remained closely involved with Chicago's Old Town School of Folk Music, where he had met and mentored his good friend, John Prine.

Later in 1971, Goodman was playing at a Chicago bar called the Quiet Knight as the opening act for Kris Kristofferson.  Impressed with Goodman, Kristofferson introduced him to Paul Anka, who brought Goodman to New York to record some demos.
These resulted in Goodman signing a contract with Buddah Records.

All this time, Goodman had been busy writing many of his most enduring songs, and this avid songwriting would lead to an important break for him.  While at the Quiet Knight, Goodman saw Arlo Guthrie and asked him to sit and let him play a song for him. Guthrie grudgingly agreed on the condition that Goodman buy him a beer first; Guthrie would then listen to Goodman for as long as it took Guthrie to drink the beer.  Goodman played "City of New Orleans", which Guthrie liked enough that he asked to record it.

Guthrie's version of Goodman's song became a Top-20 hit in 1972 and provided Goodman with enough financial and artistic success to make his music a full-time career.  The song, about the Illinois Central's City of New Orleans train, would become an American standard, covered by such musicians as Johnny Cash, Judy Collins, Chet Atkins, Lynn Anderson, and Willie Nelson, whose recorded version earned Goodman a posthumous Grammy Award for Best Country Song in 1985. A French translation of the song, "Salut Les Amoureux", was recorded by Joe Dassin in 1973. A Dutch singer, Gerard Cox, heard the French version while on holiday and translated it into Dutch, titled "'t Is Weer Voorbij Die Mooie Zomer" ("And again that beautiful summer has come to an end"). It reached number one on the Dutch Top 40 in December 1973 and has become a classic which is still played on Dutch radio. A Hebrew version of the song "Shalom Lach Eretz Nehederet" was sung by famous Israeli singer Yehoram Gaon in 1977 and became an immediate hit. Lyrically, the French, Dutch and Hebrew versions bear no resemblance to Goodman's original lyrics. According to Goodman, the song was inspired by a train trip he and his wife took from Chicago to Mattoon, Illinois. According to the liner notes on the Steve Goodman anthology No Big Surprise, "City of New Orleans" was written while on the campaign trail with Senator Edmund Muskie.

In 1974, singer David Allan Coe achieved considerable success on the country charts with Goodman's and John Prine's "You Never Even Called Me by My Name", a song which good-naturedly spoofed stereotypical country music lyrics. Prine refused to take a songwriter's credit for the song, although Goodman bought Prine a jukebox as a gift from his publishing royalties. Goodman's name is mentioned in Coe's recording of the song, in a spoken epilogue in which Goodman and Coe discuss the merits of "the perfect country and western song".

Goodman's success as a recording artist was more limited.  Although he was known in folk circles as an excellent and influential songwriter, his albums received more critical than commercial success.  One of Goodman's biggest hits was a song he didn't write: "The Dutchman", written by Michael Peter Smith. He reached a wider audience as the opening act for Steve Martin while Martin was at the height of his stand-up popularity.

During the mid and late seventies, Goodman became a regular guest on Easter Day on Vin Scelsa's radio show in New York City.  Scelsa's personal recordings of these sessions eventually led to an album of selections from these appearances, The Easter Tapes.

In 1977, Goodman performed on Tom Paxton's live album New Songs From the Briarpatch (Vanguard Records), which contained some of Paxton's topical songs of the 1970s, including "Talking Watergate" and "White Bones of Allende", as well as a song dedicated to Mississippi John Hurt entitled "Did You Hear John Hurt?"

During the fall of 1979, Goodman was hired to write and perform a series of topical songs for National Public Radio.  Although Goodman and Jethro Burns recorded eleven songs for the series, only five of them, "The Ballad of Flight 191" about a plane crash, "Daley's Gone", "Unemployed", "The Twentieth Century is Almost Over", and "The Election Year Rag", were used on the air before the series was cancelled.

Goodman wrote and performed many humorous songs about Chicago, including three about the Chicago Cubs: "A Dying Cub Fan's Last Request", "When the Cubs Go Marching In" and "Go, Cubs, Go" (which has frequently been played on Cubs broadcasts and at Wrigley Field after Cubs wins). He wrote "Go, Cubs, Go" out of spite after then GM Dallas Green called "A Dying Cub Fan's Last Request" too depressing. The Cubs songs grew out of his fanatical devotion to the team, which included many clubhouse and on-field visits with Cubs players. He wrote other songs about Chicago, including "The Lincoln Park Pirates", about the notorious Lincoln Towing Service, and "Daley's Gone", about Mayor Richard J. Daley.  Another comic highlight is "Vegematic", about a man who falls asleep while watching late-night TV and dreams he ordered many products that he saw on infomercials. He could also write serious songs, most notably "My Old Man", a tribute to Goodman's father, Bud Goodman, a used-car salesman and World War II veteran.

Goodman won his second Grammy, for Best Contemporary Folk Album, in 1988 for Unfinished Business, a posthumous album on his Red Pajamas Records label.

Many fans become aware of Goodman's work through other artists such as Jimmy Buffett. Buffett has recorded several of Goodman's songs, including "Banana Republics" and "California Promises", as well as songs co-written with Buffett: "Door Number Three", "Woman Goin' Crazy on Caroline Street", "Frank and Lola", "It's Midnight and I'm not Famous Yet", and "Where's the Party?". Jackie DeShannon covered Goodman's "Would You Like to Learn to Dance" on her 1972 album, Jackie.

Death
On September 20, 1984, Goodman died of leukemia at the University of Washington Medical Center in Seattle, Washington. He had anointed himself with the tongue-in-cheek nickname "Cool Hand Leuk" (other nicknames included "Chicago Shorty" and "The Little Prince") during his illness. He was 36 years old.

Four days after Goodman's death, the Chicago Cubs clinched the National League East division title for the first time ever, earning them their first post-season appearance since 1945, three years before Goodman's birth. Eight days later, on October 2, the Cubs played their first post-season game since Game 7 of the 1945 World Series. Goodman had been asked to sing "The Star-Spangled Banner" before it; Jimmy Buffett filled in, and dedicated the song to Goodman. Since the late 2000s, at the conclusion of every home game win, the Cubs play (and fans sing) "Go, Cubs, Go", a song Goodman wrote for his beloved team.

In April 1988, some of Goodman's ashes were scattered at Wrigley Field, the home of the Chicago Cubs.

Goodman's posthumously released album, Santa Ana Winds, included a tribute to the recently deceased Carl Martin, "You Better Get It While You Can (The Ballad of Carl Martin)", celebrating the joy both found in their music, and a refrain of,  "From the cradle to the crypt, Is a mighty short trip. So you better get it while you can".

Goodman was survived by his wife and three daughters.

Legacy
In 2006, Goodman's daughter, Rosanna, issued My Old Man, an album of a variety of artists covering her father's songs.

Interest in Goodman's career had a resurgence in 2007 with the publication of a biography by Clay Eals, Steve Goodman: Facing the Music.  The same year, the Chicago Cubs began playing Goodman's 1984 song "Go, Cubs, Go" after each home game win. When the Cubs made it to the playoffs, interest in the song and Goodman resulted in several newspaper articles about him. Illinois Lieutenant Governor Pat Quinn declared October 5, 2007, Steve Goodman Day in the state. In 2010, Illinois Representative Mike Quigley introduced a bill renaming the Lakeview post office on Irving Park Road in honor of Goodman. The bill was signed by President Barack Obama on August 3, 2010.

Discography

Albums

Compilation albums

Videos

References

Further reading
Eals, Clay. Steve Goodman: Facing the Music. ECW Press, 2007. .

External links
Official site

 
 
Steve Goodman: Facing the Music Biography by Clay Eals, May 2007

1948 births
1984 deaths
American folk singers
Deaths from cancer in Washington (state)
Deaths from leukemia
Folk musicians from Chicago
Grammy Award winners
Jewish American musicians
Jewish American songwriters
Lake Forest College alumni
Old Town School of Folk musicians
Singers from Chicago
Chicago Cubs
20th-century American singers
American male singer-songwriters
Jewish folk singers
20th-century American male singers
Country musicians from Illinois
20th-century American Jews
Singer-songwriters from Illinois